Nectandra reflexa is a species of plant in the family Lauraceae. It is found in Ecuador and Peru.

References

reflexa
Trees of Ecuador
Trees of Peru
Vulnerable plants
Taxonomy articles created by Polbot